The Edward Morgan Log House is a historic house built c. 1770. It is located at 850 Weikel Rd. in Towamencin Township, Montgomery County, Pennsylvania and was listed on the National Register of Historic Places in 1973.

History
Six-hundred acres, including the house site, was granted by the Commissioners of William Penn to Griffith Jones, a merchant, on February 12, 1702. Edward Morgan bought 309 acres of that land on February 26, 1708. An unspecified "dwelling house" was part of the purchase, though Morgan appears to have been the first settler to live on the property. Morgan came to Pennsylvania in 1698 and settled north of the area's main Welsh settlement in Gwynedd.  In 1720 his daughter Sarah married Squire Boone, and ten years later, the couple moved to Berks County, where Daniel Boone was born in 1734.  Other descendants of Edward Morgan include Daniel Morgan, Lowell Thomas, and Walter L. Morgan.

In 1723, Edward Morgan deeded 104 acres, including the house, to his son John Morgan, who sold the property to Evan David in 1741. John Yeakel, a Schwenkfelder, bought the property in 1770 and then sold 82 acres to Yellis Cassel, a Mennonite, in 1774. The property stayed in the Cassel family for 99 years until Frederick Bower bought the house along with 62 acres.  After several other owners, William Nash bought the house and 17 acres in 1965, and planned to develop and subdivide the land.  The house was condemned in 1967, but was recognized as a historic structure the same year and an organization was formed to save it from demolition. Towamencin Township bought the house along with 1.7 acres in 1970.

The Welsh Valley Preservation Society now operates tours of the Morgan Log House.

Architecture
The house has two-and-a-half stories, with a center chimney.  It was constructed of white oak logs with notched corners and chinked with diagonally placed stones. A pent roof runs around three sides of the house, and the gable ends were covered in vertical sheathing. The original interior is well preserved, including original hand wrought hardware and a large central fireplace.

By 1976, the floor plan was restored to three rooms on the first floor, with a spring room in the partial basement, three rooms on the second floor, and an undivided attic.

References

External links
Morgan Log House - Welsh Valley Preservation Society

Houses on the National Register of Historic Places in Pennsylvania
Houses completed in 1700
Houses in Montgomery County, Pennsylvania
Museums in Montgomery County, Pennsylvania
Historic house museums in Pennsylvania
National Register of Historic Places in Montgomery County, Pennsylvania
Log buildings and structures on the National Register of Historic Places in Pennsylvania
1700 establishments in Pennsylvania